Bogatskoye is a rural locality (a settlement) in Novoilyinsky Selsoviet, Khabarsky District, Altai Krai, Russia. The population was 235 as of 2013. It was founded in 1735. There are 3 streets.

Geography 
Bogatskoye is located 39 km southwest of Khabary (the district's administrative centre) by road.

References 

Rural localities in Khabarsky District